Lawton is an unincorporated community in Cherokee County, Kansas, United States, and located at .

History
Lawton once had a post office; it was discontinued in 1986.

References

Further reading

External links
 Cherokee County maps: Current, Historic, KDOT

Unincorporated communities in Cherokee County, Kansas
Unincorporated communities in Kansas